Hong Jin (27 August 1877 – 9 September 1946), also known as Hong Myeon-hui, was a leader of the Korean independence movement. He is also sometimes known by his pen name Mano (만오, 晩悟), and his Christian name, Andre.

He was born under the Joseon Dynasty in Yeongdong, Chungcheong Province, to a yangban family of the Pungsan Hong lineage. He had practiced law in Korea in the private sector and in the government sector as a prosecutor and a judge before joining the independence movement.

Hong held a number of chief positions under the Provisional Government of the Republic of Korea during the Japanese Occupation. Under his administration as the fourth President, the provisional Korean government was recognized by the Republic of China, France and Poland. His main theme was unity among factions of the Korean independence movement.

In 1928, he established the "Korean Independence Party" (한국독립당, 韓國獨立黨) with Kim Gu, Yi Dong-nyung, and he was elected to an executive position in the Korean Independence camp (한국광복진선, 韓國光復陣線) in 1938. After the independence of Korea was gained, he returned to South Korea having earned recognition as a Provisional Government leading figure who acted as Chairman of the Emergency National Council (비상국민회의, 非常國民會議). Hong was posthumously honored by the government of the Republic of Korea with the Order of Independence Merit for National Foundation in 1962.

His biography by Professor Han, Si Joon contains a detailed family tree of Hong Jin tracing back to Goryeo dynasty's Hong Ji-gyeong, later known as a great master of Korean classical verse in the Joseon Dynasty. The current family jokbo contains surviving members of the family who are naturalized American citizens.

Note
The spelling of his name in his correspondence with American dignitaries including a condolence letter regarding President Franklin D. Roosevelt's death was Hong Chin instead of Hong Jin.

See also
List of Koreans
History of Korea
Korea under Japanese rule
Korean independence movements

External links
 Empas entry

Korean independence activists
1877 births
1946 deaths
Recipients of the Order of Merit for National Foundation